David Caspari (5 March 1648 – 28 February 1702) was a German Lutheran theologian. He was the father of Georg Caspari.

Born in Königsberg, Duchy of Prussia, Caspari studied at the Albertina and the universities of Jena, Wittenberg, Leipzig, Altdorf, Strassburg, and Helmstedt. He became sub-inspector at the Albertina in 1676. Two years later he was appointed rector of Riga Cathedral's school. Caspari died in Riga as the school's superintendent.

Works
De Vita Dei, Qualis ea sit ex Mente Graecorum et Potissimum Aristotelis (Jena, 1673)
De Quaestione an Virtus Cadat in Deum (Königsberg, 1677)
De Futuri Theologi Studiis Philologicis et Philosophicis (edited by Georg Caspari, 1705)
Breviarium Theologiae Moralis (edited by Georg Caspari, 1712)

References
John McClintock. Cyclopaedia of Biblical, Theological, and Ecclesiastical Literature. Harper and Brothers. New York. 1889 
Johann Friedrich von Recke, Karl Eduard von Napiersky. Allgemeines Schriftsteller- und Gelehrten-Lexikon der Provinzen Livland, Esthland und Kurland. Johann Friedrich Steffenhagen und Sohn. Mitau. 1827  

1648 births
1702 deaths
German Lutheran theologians
Clergy from Königsberg
People from the Duchy of Prussia
University of Altdorf alumni
University of Helmstedt alumni
University of Jena alumni
University of Königsberg alumni
Academic staff of the University of Königsberg
Leipzig University alumni
University of Strasbourg alumni
17th-century German Protestant theologians
German male non-fiction writers
17th-century German writers
17th-century German male writers